Helluodes is a genus of beetles in the family Carabidae, containing the following species:

 Helluodes devagiriensis Sabu, Abhita & Zhao, 2008
 Helluodes taprobanae Westwood, 1847
 Helluodes westwoodii Chaudoir, 1869

References

Anthiinae (beetle)